The Politics of Guangdong follows a dual party-government system like the rest of China's provinces.  Guangdong is known for a surge of legislative activism in recent years, often called the Guangdong Phenomenon (Guangdong Xianxiang). The Guangdong Provincial People's Congress has enacted measures to increase democracy and transparency, and exert more control over the financial sector. In a well-publicized case in 2000, the Guangdong PPC also harshly criticized the Environmental Protection Bureau for allowing the construction of an electroplating park without a proper environmental impact investigation.

List of Chinese Communist Party Committee Secretaries

List of governors
Ye Jianying: November 1948 – September 1953
Tao Zhu: September 1953 – August 1957
Chen Yu: August 1957 – November 1967
Huang Yongsheng: November 1967 – June 1969
Liu Xingyuan: June 1969 – April 1972
Ding Sheng: April 1972 – April 1974
Zhao Ziyang: April 1974 – October 1975
Wei Guoqing: October 1975 – January 1979
Xi Zhongxun: (1979–1981)
Liu Tianfu: (1981–1983)
Liang Lingguang: (1983–1985)
Ye Xuanping: (1985–1991)
Zhu Senlin: (1991–1996)
Lu Ruihua: (1996–2003)
Huang Huahua: (2003–2011)
Zhu Xiaodan: (2011–2016)
Ma Xingrui: (2016–2021)
Wang Weizhong: (2021-present)

List of chairmen of Guangdong People's Congress
Li Jianzhen: 1979–1983
Luo Tian: 1983–1990
Lin Ruo: 1990–1996
Zhu Senlin: 1996–2001
Zhang Guoying: 2001–2003
Lu Zhonghe: 2003–2005
Huang Liman: 2005 – January 2008
Ou Guangyuan: January 2008 – January 2013
Huang Longyun: January 2013 – January 2017
Li Yumei: January 2017- January 2022
Huang Chuping(): January 2022-present

List of chairmen of Guangdong CPPCC
Tao Zhu: 1955–1960　
Ou Mengjue: 1960–1967　
Wang Shoudao: 1977–1979　
Yin Linping: 1979–1983　
Liang Weilin: 1983–1985
Wu Nansheng: 1985–1993　
Guo Rongchang: 1993–2003　
Liu Fengyi: 2003　
Chen Shaoji: 2004 – April 2009
Huang Longyun: 2009–2013
Zhu Mingguo: 2013–2014
Wang Rong: 2015–present

List of Chairmen of the Guangdong National Supervisory Commission 
Shi Kehui (施克辉): 2018-2021
Song Fulong (宋福龙): 2021-present

References

 
Guangdong

Guangdong
Guangdong, politics
Guangdong